Phospholipase D (EC 3.1.4.4, lipophosphodiesterase II, lecithinase D, choline phosphatase, PLD; systematic name phosphatidylcholine phosphatidohydrolase) is an enzyme of the phospholipase superfamily that catalyses the following reaction

 a phosphatidylcholine + H2O = choline + a phosphatidate

Phospholipases occur widely, and can be found in a wide range of organisms, including bacteria, yeast, plants, animals, and viruses. Phospholipase D's principal substrate is phosphatidylcholine, which it hydrolyzes to produce the signal molecule phosphatidic acid (PA), and soluble choline in a cholesterol dependent process called substrate presentation. Plants contain numerous genes that encode various PLD isoenzymes, with molecular weights ranging from 90 to 125 kDa. Mammalian cells encode two isoforms of phospholipase D: PLD1 and PLD2. Phospholipase D is an important player in many physiological processes, including membrane trafficking, cytoskeletal reorganization, receptor-mediated endocytosis, exocytosis, and cell migration. Through these processes, it has been further implicated in the pathophysiology of multiple diseases: in particular the progression of Parkinson's and Alzheimer's, as well as various cancers. PLD may also help set the threshold for sensitivity to anesthesia and mechanical force.

Discovery 
PLD-type activity was first reported in 1947 by Donald J. Hanahan and I.L. Chaikoff. It was not until 1975, however, that the hydrolytic mechanism of action was elucidated in mammalian cells. Plant isoforms of PLD were first purified from cabbage and castor bean; PLDα was ultimately cloned and characterized from a variety of plants, including rice, corn, and tomato. Plant PLDs have been cloned in three isoforms: PLDα, PLDβ, and PLDγ.
More than half a century of biochemical studies have implicated phospholipase D and PA activity in a wide range of physiological processes and diseases, including inflammation, diabetes, phagocytosis, neuronal & cardiac signaling, and oncogenesis.

Function 
Strictly speaking, phospholipase D is a transphosphatidylase: it mediates the exchange of polar headgroups covalently attached to membrane-bound lipids. Utilizing water as a nucleophile, this enzyme catalyzes the cleavage of the phosphodiester bond in structural phospholipids such as phosphatidylcholine and phosphatidylethanolamine. The products of this hydrolysis are the membrane-bound lipid phosphatidic acid (PA), and choline, which diffuses into the cytosol. As choline has little second messenger activity, PLD activity is mostly transduced by the production of PA. PA is heavily involved in intracellular signal transduction. In addition, some members of the PLD superfamily may employ primary alcohols such as ethanol or 1-butanol in the cleavage of the phospholipid, effectively catalyzing the exchange the polar lipid headgroup. Other members of this family are able hydrolyze other phospholipid substrates, such as cardiolipin, or even the phosphodiester bond constituting the backbone of DNA.

Phosphatidic acid

Many of phospholipase D's cellular functions are mediated by its principal product, phosphatidic acid (PA). PA is a negatively charged phospholipid, whose small head group promotes membrane curvature. It is thus thought to facilitate membrane-vesicle fusion and fission in a manner analogous to clathrin-mediated endocytosis. PA may also recruit proteins that contain its corresponding binding domain, a region characterized by basic amino acid-rich regions. Additionally, PA can be converted into a number of other lipids, such as lysophosphatidic acid (lyso-PA) or diacylglycerol, signal molecules which have a multitude of effects on downstream cellular pathways. PA and its lipid derivatives are implicated in myriad processes that include intracellular vesicle trafficking, endocytosis, exocytosis, actin cytoskeleton dynamics, cell proliferation differentiation, and migration.

Mammalian PLD directly interacts with kinases like PKC, ERK, TYK and controls the signalling indicating that PLD is activated by these kinases. As choline is very abundant in the cell, PLD activity does not significantly affect choline levels, and choline is unlikely to play any role in signalling.

Phosphatidic acid is a signal molecule and acts to recruit SK1 to membranes. PA is extremely short lived and is rapidly hydrolysed by the enzyme phosphatidate phosphatase to form diacylglycerol (DAG). DAG may also be converted to PA by DAG kinase. Although PA and DAG are interconvertible, they do not act in the same pathways. Stimuli that activate PLD do not activate enzymes downstream of DAG and vice versa.

It is possible that, though PA and DAG are interconvertible, separate pools of signalling and non-signalling lipids may be maintained. Studies have suggested that DAG signalling is mediated by polyunsaturated DAG while PLD derived PA is monounsaturated or saturated. Thus functional saturated/monounsaturated PA can be degraded by hydrolysing it to form non-functional saturated/monounsaturated DAG while functional polyunsaturated DAG can be degraded by converting it into non-functional polyunsaturated PA.

A lysophospholipase D called autotaxin was recently identified as having an important role in cell-proliferation through its product,
lysophosphatidic acid (LPA).

Structure 
Plant and animal PLDs have a consistent molecular structure, characterized by sites of catalysis surrounded by an assortment of regulatory sequences. The active site of PLDs consists of four highly conserved amino acid sequences (I-IV), of which motifs II and IV are particularly conserved. These structural domains contain the distinguishing catalytic sequence HxKxxxxD (HKD), where H, K, and D are the amino acids histidine (H), lysine (K), aspartic acid (D), while x represents nonconservative amino acids. These two HKD motifs confer hydrolytic activity to PLD, and are critical for its enzymatic activity both in vitro and in vivo. Hydrolysis of the phosphodiester bond occurs when these HKD sequences are in the correct proximity.

Human proteins containing this motif include:
 PGS1, PLD1, PLD2, PLD3, PLD4, PLD5

PC-hydrolyzing PLD is a homologue of cardiolipin synthase, phosphatidylserine synthase, bacterial PLDs, and viral proteins. Each of these appears to possess a domain duplication which is apparent by the presence of two HKD motifs containing well-conserved histidine, lysine, and asparagine residues which may contribute to the active site aspartic acid. An Escherichia coli endonuclease (nuc) and similar proteins appear to be PLD homologues but possess only one of these motifs.

PLD genes additionally encode highly conserved regulatory domains: the phox consensus sequence (PX), the pleckstrin homology domain (PH), and a binding site for phosphatidylinositol 4,5-bisphosphate (PIP2).

Mechanism of catalysis
PLD-catalyzed hydrolysis has been proposed to occur in two stages via a "ping-pong" mechanism. In this scheme, the histidine residues of each HKD motif successively attack the phospholipid substrate. Functioning as nucleophiles, the constituent imidazole moieties of the histidines form transient covalent bonds with the phospholipid, producing a short-lived intermediate that can be easily hydrolyzed by water in a subsequent step.

Mechanism of activation
Substrate presentation For mammalian PLD2, the molecular basis of activation is substrate presentation. The enzyme resides inactive in lipid micro-domains rich in sphingomyelin and depleted of PC substrate. Increased PIP2 or a decrease in cholesterol causes the enzyme to translocate to PIP2 micro domains near its substrate PC. Hence PLD can is primarily activated by localization within the plasma membrane rather than a protein conformational change. Disruption of lipid domains by anesthetics. or mechanical force. The protein may also undergo a conformational change upon PIP2 binding, but this has not been shown experimentally and would constitute a mechanism of activation distinct from substrate presentation.

Isoforms
Two major isoforms of phospholipase D has been identified in mammalian cells: PLD1 and PLD2 (53% sequence homology), each encoded by distinct genes. PLD activity appears to be present in most cell types, with the possible exceptions of peripheral leukocytes and other lymphocytes. Both PLD isoforms require PIP2 as a cofactor for activity. PLD1 and PLD2 exhibit different subcellular localizations that dynamically change in the course of signal transduction. PLD activity has been observed within the plasma membrane, cytosol, ER, and Golgi complex.

PLD1

PLD1 is a 120 kDa protein that is mainly located on the inner membranes of cells. It is primarily present at the Golgi complex, endosomes, lysosomes, and secretory granules. Upon the binding of an extracellular stimulus, PLD1 is transported to the plasma membrane. Basal PLD1 activity is low however, and in order to transduce the extracellular signal, it must first be activated by proteins such as Arf, Rho, Rac, and protein kinase C.

Regulation
The activity of phospholipase D is extensively regulated by hormones, neurotransmitters, lipids, small monomeric GTPases, and other small molecules that bind to their corresponding domains on the enzyme. In most cases, signal transduction is mediated through production of phosphatidic acid, which functions as a secondary messenger.

Specific phospholipids are regulators of PLD activity in plant and animal cells.  Most PLDs require phosphatidylinositol 4,5-bisphosphate (PIP2), as a cofactors for activity. PIP2 and other phosphoinositides are important modifiers of cytoskeletal dynamics and membrane transport and can traffic PLD to its substrate PC. PLDs regulated by these phospholipids are commonly involved in intracellular signal transduction.  Their activity is dependent upon the binding of these phosphoinositides near the active site. In plants and animals, this binding site is characterized by the presence of a conserved sequence of basic and aromatic amino acids.  In plants such as Arabidopsis thaliana, this sequence is constituted by a RxxxxxKxR motif together with its inverted repeat, where R is arginine and K is lysine. Its proximity to the active site ensures high level of PLD1 and PLD2 activity, and promotes the translocation of PLD1 to target membranes in response to extracellular signals.

C2 domain

Calcium acts as a cofactor in PLD isoforms that contain the C2 domain. Binding of Ca2+ to the C2 domain leads to conformational changes in the enzyme that strengthen enzyme-substrate binding, while weakening the association with phosphoinositides. In some plant isoenzymes, such as PLDβ, Ca2+ may bind directly to the active site, indirectly increasing its affinity for the substrate by strengthening the binding of the activator PIP2.

PX domain

The pbox consensus sequence (PX) is thought to mediate the binding of additional phosphatidylinositol phosphates, in particular, phosphatidylinositol 5-phosphate (PtdIns5P), a lipid thought to be required for endocytosis, may help facilitate the reinternalization of PLD1 from the plasma membrane.

PH domain

The highly conserved Pleckstrin homology domain (PH) is a structural domain approximately 120 amino acids in length. It binds phosphatidylinositides such as phosphatidylinositol (3,4,5)-trisphosphate (PIP3) and phosphatidylinositol (4,5)-bisphosphate (PIP2). It may also bind heterotrimeric G proteins via their βγ-subunit. Binding to this domain is also thought to facilitate the re-internalization of the protein by increasing its affinity to endocytotic lipid rafts.

Interactions with small GTPases

In animal cells, small protein factors are important additional regulators of PLD activity. These small monomeric GTPases are members of the Rho and ARF families of the Ras superfamily. Some of these proteins, such as Rac1, Cdc42, and RhoA, allosterically activate mammalian PLD1, directly increasing its activity. In particular, the translocation of cytosolic ADP-ribosylation factor (ARF) to the plasma membrane is essential for PLD activation.

Physiological and pathophysiological roles

Alcohol Intoxication
Phospholipase D metabolizes ethanol into phosphatidylethanol (PEtOH) in a process termed transphosphatidylation.  Using fly genetics the PEtOH was shown to mediates alcohol's hyperactive response in fruit flies. And ethanol transphosphatidylation was shown to be up-regulated in alcoholics and the family members of alcoholic.s This ethanol transphosphatidylation mechanism recently emerged as an alternative theory for alcohol's effect on ion channels. Many ion channels are regulated by anionic lipids. and the competition of PEtOH with endogenous signaling lipids is thought to mediate the effect of ethanol on ion channels in some instances and not direct binding of the free ethanol to the channel.

Mechanosensation
PLD2 is a mechanosensor and directly sensitive to mechanical disruption of clustered GM1 lipids. Mechanical disruption (fluid shear) then signals for the cell to differentiate. PLD2 also activates TREK-1 channels, a potassium channel in the analgesic pathway.

In cancer
Phospholipase D is a regulator of several critical cellular processes, including vesicle transport, endocytosis, exocytosis, cell migration, and mitosis. Dysregulation of these processes is commonplace in carcinogenesis, and in turn, abnormalities in PLD expression have been implicated in the progression of several types cancer. A driver mutation conferring elevated PLD2 activity has been observed in several malignant breast cancers. Elevated PLD expression has also been correlated with tumor size in colorectal carcinoma, gastric carcinoma, and renal cancer. However, the molecular pathways through which PLD drives cancer progression remain unclear. One potential hypothesis casts a critical role for phospholipase D in the activation of mTOR, a suppressor of cancer cell apoptosis. The ability of PLD to suppress apoptosis in cells with elevated tyrosine kinase activity makes it a candidate oncogene in cancers where such expression is typical.

In neurodegenerative diseases
Phospholipase D may also play an important pathophysiological role in the progression of neurodegenerative diseases, primarily through its capacity as a signal transducer in indispensable cellular processes like cytoskeletal reorganization and vesicle trafficking. Dysregulation of PLD by the protein α-synuclein has been shown to lead to the specific loss of dopaminergic neurons in mammals. α-synuclein is the primary structural component of Lewy bodies, protein aggregates that are the hallmarks of Parkinson's disease. Disinhibition of PLD by α-synuclein may contribute to Parkinson's deleterious phenotype.

Abnormal PLD activity has also been suspected in Alzheimer's disease, where it has been observed to interact with presenilin 1 (PS-1), the principal component of the γ-secretase complex responsible for the enzymatic cleavage of amyloid precursor protein (APP). Extracellular plaques of the product β-amyloid are a defining feature of Alzheimer's diseased brains. Action of PLD1 on PS-1 has been shown to affect the intracellular trafficking of the amyloid precursor to this complex. Phospholipase D3 (PLD3), a non-classical and poorly characterized member of the PLD superfamily, has also been associated with the pathogenesis of this disease.

Gallery

References

External links 
 

EC 3.1.4
Peripheral membrane proteins